Richard Schenkman (born March 6, 1958) is an American screenwriter, film producer, film director and occasional actor. He has also been credited under the name George Axmith.

Awards
He has won seven awards at film festivals such as the Austin Film Festival, Oldenburg International Film Festival, Rhode Island International Film Festival and WorldFest Flagstaff.

Filmography

Film

Television

References

External links

 

1958 births
American film directors
American film producers
American male screenwriters
Living people